Wie Lijie also known as Wei Li-Chieh is a former international table tennis player from China.

Table tennis career
She won a silver medal at the 1977 World Table Tennis Championships in the women's doubles with Zhu Xiangyun.

See also
 List of table tennis players
 List of World Table Tennis Championships medalists

References

Living people
Chinese female table tennis players
Table tennis players from Beijing
World Table Tennis Championships medalists
Year of birth missing (living people)